Sally A. Heyman is an American politician, businesswoman, and attorney serving as a commissioner of Miami-Dade County, Florida for District 4. Heyman was first elected in September 2002 after serving in the Florida House of Representatives for eight years.

Education

She received her bachelor's degree from the University of Florida, a master's degree from Nova Southeastern University, and a Juris Doctor degree from the University of Miami.

Career 
Her first role in public office was as a Council Member for the City of North Miami Beach, where she served for seven years, and worked for the City of Miami and North Miami Beach Police Department. Heyman is currently a member of South Florida Regional Planning Council (SFRPC); Board Member Florida Association of Counties (FAC); FAC Vice Chair Large Urban Counties (LUC); Board Member National Association of Counties (NACo); NACo Steering Committee for Large Urban Counties Caucus (LUCC); NACo Public Safety and Justice Committee; NACo Vice-Chair - Emergency Management and Domestic Security Committee; member National Homeland Security Consortium. Heyman works on responsible growth management, workforce housing initiatives, transportation alternatives, public safety and animal services. Heyman is a Crime Prevention Specialist for two police departments and an adjunct professor of Criminal Justice at Florida International University (FIU). Her involvement in the Jewish community is also extensive as she maintains membership in ORT, Hillel of North Dade, MAR-JCC, the Greater Miami Jewish Federation and Jewish Community Services of South Florida.

As a state representative she served four consecutive terms, where the nature of her sponsored legislation was public safety. She passed bills into law addressing domestic violence, juvenile justice, boat safety, increased penalties for elder and child abuse, debt collection courts, end of life directives, agriculture theft, outreach for high-risk pregnant women, eminent domain and adoption-foster care.

Heyman is also the owner of her own gourmet coffee food truck, Coffee Brake.

While Commission seats are officially non-partisan, Heyman is an affiliated member of the Democratic Party

References

External links
 Jewish Museum of Florida - FIU
 Miami-Dade County Commission District 4

County commissioners in Florida
Jewish American state legislators in Florida
Democratic Party members of the Florida House of Representatives
Living people
University of Florida alumni
Women state legislators in Florida
People from North Miami Beach, Florida
21st-century American politicians
1954 births
21st-century American women politicians
21st-century American Jews